Black Mountain is a prominent mountain summit in the Elkhead Mountains range of the Rocky Mountains of North America. Black Mountain is the highest point in Moffat County.

Mountain

Historical names
Black Mountain 
Welba Peak

See also

List of mountain peaks of Colorado
List of the most prominent summits of Colorado
List of Colorado county high points

References

External links

Mountains of Colorado
Mountains of Moffat County, Colorado
Routt National Forest
North American 3000 m summits